Metropolitan Fire Brigade (MFB) could refer to:

Metropolitan Fire Brigade (London)
Metropolitan Fire Brigade (Melbourne)